Bhamidipally Narasimha Murthy (born 28 October 1957), commonly known by his mononymous pen name Bnim, is an Indian writer and cartoonist from the state of Andhra Pradesh. He received Kala Ratna award and four Nandi Awards.

Early life 
Bnim was born on 28 October 1957 to Bhamidipally Suryanarayana Murthy and Vijaya Lakshmi in Atreyapuram, East Godavari district (now in Konaseema district), Andhra Pradesh. He grew up in Atreyapuram before moving to Hyderabad in 1981. He is an Ayurvedic doctor, however, he does not practice medicine. He has a brother.

Writing career 
Bnim started writing since 1975. His cartoons were published in Prabhava, a monthly publication. After moving to Hyderabad, he started working at Vikas Advertiser for his livelihood. He worked at Andhra Bhoomi, Krishna Patrika and Suprabhatam publications in pursuit of learning arts. He debuted working in television with Doordarshan during 1985–86 with his cartoon Adugu Puli. , he worked in 30 television shows and 60 single episodes in various departments – editing, dubbing, designing and modulation. He has also written several television show titles on comedy, historical, mythological and social concepts.

He said he used at least 26 pen names for his works including Bnim and Neelapriya, which he used for poetry. According to him, he chose the pen name Bnim reflecting his initials "BNM" with "I" reflecting himself. His writing works are published in Andhra Bhoomi, Swathi, Chinuku magazines.

Kuchipudi ballets 
In 1990s, he started writing scripts for Kuchipudi ballets. He debuted with Madhura Swapna ballet for Pedilka Narsingh Rao based on the life of Rabindranath Tagore. He scripted five different ballets on Ramayana from various perspectives, some from the eyes of Ravana, Mandhara and Shabari. , he scripted 254 ballets.

He contributed scripts for Maddali Usha Gayatri ballets –  Matru Devo Bhava, Goda Kalyanam, Pushkara Pulakita Godavari, Swetcha Bharat.

Reception 
Gudipoodi Srihari of The Hindu opined that the scripting by Bnim for Goda Kalyanam, which portrays the Hindu deities Ranganatha, a form of Vishnu, and Goda Devi, was unique and creative compared to other exponents of Kuchipudi. Srihari wrote that Bnim, in contrast to common practice, took inspiration from Hindu gods Rama and Krishna, both of whom are avatars of Vishnu.

Films 
Bnim scripted a song in Telugu-language movie Yamudu Anna Ki Mogudu which was well received. However, he did not pursue a career in films any further.

Other work 
Bnim established Bapu-Ramana Academy – in memory of Bapu and Mullapudi Venkata Ramana – and gives away Bapu Award to one cartoonist and Ramana Award to one writer every year. He also worked as an advisor at Akshagna Publication.

Awards 
Bnim was conferred with Kala Ratna award by the Government of Andhra Pradesh. He has also received four Nandi Awards for his works in television for his contributions to screenplay, story and dialogues.

References 

Living people
1957 births
20th-century Indian male writers
21st-century Indian male writers
People from Konaseema district
Writers from Hyderabad, India
Indian cartoonists
Recipients of the Kala Ratna
Nandi Award winners
Telugu writers